Return to Montauk (Rückkehr nach Montauk) is a 2017 German drama film directed by Volker Schlöndorff. It was selected to compete for the Golden Bear in the main competition section of the 67th Berlin International Film Festival.

Plot
During a book tour in the United States, Max meets and falls in love with a young woman. Many years later, Max returns to the United States, hoping to reunite with his former lover during a weekend on Long Island in Montauk.

The plot is broadly inspired by Max Frisch's 1975 novel Montauk.

Cast

Stellan Skarsgård as Max Zorn
Nina Hoss as Rebecca
Niels Arestrup as Walter
Susanne Wolff as Clara
Bronagh Gallagher as Rachel
 as Jonathan
Isioma Laborde-Edozien as Lindsey 
Paul Bonin as Wally
 as Mark McDonald
Daniel Brunet as designer
Ray Wiederhold as the doorman 
Olga Lezhneva as girl

Production
The shooting started in New York City and Long Island in April 2016.

References

External links

2017 drama films
English-language German films
English-language French films
English-language Irish films
German drama films
Films directed by Volker Schlöndorff
Films based on Swiss novels
Films scored by Max Richter
Films shot in New York City
Films shot in New York (state)
Films shot in Berlin
2010s English-language films
2010s German films